Hajong may refer to:
Hajong people, ethnic group in northeastern India
Hajong ethnic religion, their traditional religious practices
Hajong language, their Indo-Aryan language
Hajong marriage, their marriage ceremonies

Language and nationality disambiguation pages